Richland County is the name of several counties in the United States:

 Richland County, Illinois
 Richland County, Montana
 Richland County, North Dakota
 Richland County, Ohio
 Richland County, South Carolina
 Richland County, Wisconsin

See also
 Richland Parish, Louisiana